Batiar (also sometimes spelled as baciar), a popular name for a certain class of inhabitants of city of Lviv. It is considered a part of the city's subculture, Lviv's "knajpa" lifestyle, and became a phenomenon at the beginning of the twentieth century although its roots go back to the mid nineteenth century when Lviv was part of the Austro-Hungarian Empire. It declined after the Soviet occupation of Eastern Poland and its annexation to the Soviet Union as part of the Ukrainian SSR in 1939 and again in 1945. The Soviet authorities expelled most of the Polish inhabitants and suppressed the local Polish culture. However, the use of the term continued, and it is a popular term of endearment in today's Lviv. Since 2008 Lviv celebrates "International Batiar Day", started by the "Dik-Art" company in cooperation with the Lviv City Council. Batiars are seen as embodying the unique culture and spirit of Lviv, and are often celebrated in local folklore and popular culture.

Roots of the term
Origins of the term may be Hungarian, since in 19th century Lviv was a part of the Austro-Hungarian Empire, some of its policemen were Hungarians and they brought the term to the local dialect from their native language.

Definition by the Encyclopædia Britannica:

History
It was the name of lower-class inhabitants of Lwów (the "elite of Lviv's streets"). Batiars spoke their distinctive version of the Polish language, which was called Bałak and was a variant of the Lwów dialect. A typical batiar in common imagination was usually financially challenged, but honest and generous urban citizen with a great sense of humor. Among most famous batiars, there were such names as radio personalities Kazimierz Wajda and Henryk Vogelfänger of the highly popular Wesoła Lwowska Fala radio show, as well as football star Michał Matyas, who played for Pogoń Lwów and the national team of Poland.

The name is still in local use, but now in the Ukrainian language. Now batiars are the playboys of the Ukrainian Piedmont, as Eastern Galicia is sometimes referred to, and are easily identified by exquisite manners, stylish attire, and an obligatory attribute of every batiar, lyaska (walking stick).

Quotes

(Bohdan Rybka, batiar)

(Ivan Radkovets, Lviv Studies specialist)

(Miroslava Sydor, batiar's koliezanka)

Cultural influence
The Batiar's Day in Lviv replaced the Soviet holiday of 1 May (the Labor Day), the Day of Worker's Solidarity. Batiars also adopted the proletarian motto: Batiars of all countries unite!.

At the time of the rise of batiar's culture, Lviv's Polish-Jewish poet Emanuel Szlechter wrote lyrics for a song that became well known in Poland, Tylko we Lwowie ("Only in Lwów"; from comedy film The Vagabonds) which became the anthem of batiars, and the accompanying music was written by another ethnic Jew, the Polish Henryk Wars. The Ukrainian repertoire of that song is performed by Yurko Hnatovsky (in retro-psychedelic style) and Zosya Fedina.

Batiars of 21st century
The urban subculture of today's Lviv continues to develop with different styles arising out of its ferment. Among the most prominent representatives are Vova zi Lvova, Orest Lyutyi, and many others.

See also
 Semantic change
 Wesoła Lwowska Fala

References

External links 
 Witold Szolginia, Batiar and his balak (in Polish)
 Homo leopolensis essay from under the "microscope of pan Yurko" 
 Definition of Betyar by Encyclopædia Britannica 
 The Batiar's Day report by "UkrInform" 
 Phenomenon of Lwow's "knajpa" 
 Biesiady i Combry from Agencja Artystyczna (Ta-joj, Europo! - Biesiada Lwowska) 
 Batiar's of the Ukrainian Lviv 

Culture in Lviv
Social class subcultures